The office of the President of the Presidency of the Socialist Republic of Serbia existed from its establishment in the 1974 constitution to its renaming and then total abolishment as part of democratic reforms in 1990.

A collective presidency existed in Yugoslavia at the federal level since amendments to the constitution in 1971. On 21 February 1974 a new federal Constitution was adopted which reaffirmed the collective federal presidency chaired by the President of the Presidency. The constituent republics adopted the same system in new constitutions of their own.

List of presidents

See also
Presidium of Yugoslavia
President of the Presidency of Yugoslavia

References

Socialist Republic of Serbia
1974 establishments in Serbia
1990 disestablishments in Serbia